Baconsthorpe is a village and civil parish in the North Norfolk district of the English county of Norfolk.

Population and governance
The civil parish has an area of 5.53 km². In the 2001 census it had a population of 232 in 105 households. This eased to 215 at the Census 2011, and was estimated at 216 in 2019. For local government, the parish is in the district of North Norfolk.

Heritage
The village's name derives from "Bacon's outlying farm/settlement", Bacon being the surname of the local landowner in Norman times.

The medieval Anglican Church of St Mary was restored in 1868 and 1958. It contains monuments from the 15th–18th centuries and some 16th-century glass saved from the castle.

Accommodation
There is a tourist campsite with full amenities at Pitt Farm near the west end of the village. Some bed-and-breakfast accommodation and holiday lets are also available. Other facilities and services can be found in the nearby town of Holt.

Notable residents
In order of birth:
John Baconthorpe [sic] or Bacon (c. 1290–1347), Carmelite monk and scholastic philosopher, born at Baconsthorpe
John Heydon or Baxter (died 1479) rose from the yeomanry to become prominent as a lawyer.
Sir Henry Heydon (died 1504), lawyer, courtier and landowner, died at Baconsthorpe.
Sir Christopher Heydon (1561–1623), soldier, astrologer, and a county member of Parliament for Norfolk, ran his Norfolk estates from Baconsthorpe Castle.
Robert Brightiffe (c. 1666–1749), a barrister and a member of Parliament for Norwich and recorder there, was born at his father's house in Baconsthorpe.

War Memorial
Baconsthorpe's War Memorials take the form of two plaques in St. Mary's Church, they hold the following names for the First World War:
 Corporal Horace E. Dew (d.1916), 7th Battalion, Royal Norfolk Regiment
 Gunner George R. Cooper (1891-1917), 'A' Depot, Royal Garrison Artillery
 Rifleman Robert Jermy (d.1918), 9th (London) Battalion, Queen Victoria's Rifles
 Private E. F. Frank Thursby (1896-1917), 2nd Battalion, Border Regiment
 Private Henry J. Smith (d.1917), 2nd Battalion, Middlesex Regiment
 Private Frederick B. Dew (1893-1916), 2nd Battalion, Royal Norfolk Regiment
 Private Frederick Knowles (d.1916), 2nd Battalion, Royal Norfolk Regiment
 Private A. W. Richard Cletheroe (1896-1917), 5th Battalion, Royal Norfolk Regiment
 Private William T. Jarvis (1897-1917), 7th Battalion, Royal Norfolk Regiment
 William J. Barnes

And, the following for the Second World War:
 Corporal Leslie F. Smith (d.1944), 1st Battalion, Durham Light Infantry
 Ordinary-Seaman Geoffrey D. Grout (1919-1940), HMS Forfar (F30)

References

External links

Information from Genuki Norfolk on Baconsthorpe

 
Villages in Norfolk
Civil parishes in Norfolk
North Norfolk